PRISM is a probabilistic model checker, a formal verification software tool for the modelling and analysis of systems that exhibit probabilistic behaviour. One source of such systems is the use of randomization, for example in communication protocols like Bluetooth and FireWire, or in security protocols such as Crowds and Onion routing. Stochastic behaviour also arises in many other computer systems, for example due to equipment failures or unpredictable communication delays. Yet another class of systems amenable to this kind of analysis are biochemical reaction networks.

PRISM can be used to analyse several different types of probabilistic models, including discrete-time Markov chains, continuous-time Markov chains, Markov decision processes and probabilistic extensions of the timed automata formalism. Properties to be verified against these models are expressed in probabilistic extensions of temporal logic.

Development of PRISM is primarily carried out at the University of Birmingham and the University of Oxford. The tool is open-source software, released under the GNU General Public License. PRISM has been selected for the Google Summer of Code programme in 2013 and 2014.

References

External links
PRISM website
PRISM case studies repository

Model checkers
Free application software
Probabilistic software